15,000 BC in art involved some significant events.

Events 

Cave paintings were born during this time period. Historians now use these cave paintings as a guide to help them unravel early human history.

Art 

 Almost all of the art recovered for this era is from the Magdalenian cultures which is why you would see its influence on the artifacts. Several important pieces of art recovered from this era provides an insight to the lives of humans of that time. All of these pieces were from the Europe region. A few of the major and popular pieces that were recovered are:

 Paintings created at Lascaux, Montignac, France
 Figurine of Venus of Waldstetten, Waldstetten, Germany
 Figurine of Venus of Eliseevichi, Bryansk, Russia

References

Art by year